Events from the year 1324 in Ireland.

Incumbent
Lord: Edward II

Events
 "The same cow-destruction (namely, the Maeldornnaigh) prevailed throughout Ireland."
 Archbishop Ledrede of Ossory accuses Alice Kyteler and her associates of witchcraft and heresy. Alice was the first person in Ireland to be condemned for alleged witchcraft.
 Alexander de Bicknor  starts the construction of Tallaght Castle

Deaths
12 February – William Liath de Burgh, buried in Galway.
3 November – Petronilla de Meath, maidservant, first case in Ireland's history of burning at the stake for the crime of heresy (b. 1300).

References

Annala Uladh: Annals of Ulster.
Annals of the Four Masters.
Annals of Loch Cé.